The southern state of India,Karnataka, has a distinct art and culture informed by a long history of diverse linguistic and religious ethnicity.  Apart from Kannadigas, Karnataka is home to Tuluvas,  who also consider themselves as Kannadigas. Minor populations of Tibetan Buddhists and Siddhi tribes plus a few other ethnic groups also live in. 
The traditional folk arts are major theatrical forms of coastal Karnataka. Contemporary theatre culture in Karnataka is one of the most vibrant in India with organizations like Ninasam, Ranga Shankara and Rang on foundations laid down by the Gubbi Veeranna Nataka Company. Veeragase, Kamsale and Dollu Kunitha are popular dance forms. Bharatanatya also enjoys wide patronage in Karnataka.

Music 
Karnataka is the only Indian state where c singers flourish. North Karnataka is predominantly famous for Hindustani music and South Karnataka is well known for Carnatic music.

Carnatic music

With the rise of Vaishnavism and the Haridasa movement came Karnataka composers like Purandaradasa, whose Kannada language works were lucid, devotional and cultural and hence appealing to the masses.  Other haridasas of medieval times were Kanakadasa, Vyasatirtha, Jayatirtha, Sripadaraya, Vadirajatirtha etc., who composed several devara nama.  One of the earliest and prominent composers in South India was the saint, and wandering bard of yore Purandara Dasa.  Though historians claim Purandara Dasa composed 75,000 - 475,000 songs in Sanskrit and Kannada, only a few hundred of them are known today. He was a source of inspiration to the later composers like Tyagaraja. Owing to his contribution to the Carnatic Music he is referred to as the Father of Carnatic Music (Karnataka Sangeeta Pitamaha).
Purandaradasa codified and consolidated the teaching of Carnatic music by evolving several steps like sarali, jantai(Janti), thattu varisai (Thattu Varise), alankara and geetham (geethe) and laid down a framework for imparting formal training in this art form. Later in the 17th and 18th centuries, the haridasa movement would once again contribute to music in Karnataka in the form of haridasas such as Vijaya Dasa, Gopaladasa, Jagannathadasa who are just a few among a vast galaxy of devotional saints.

Hindustani music
Karnataka has achieved a prominent place in the world of Hindustani music as well. Several of Karnataka's Hindustani musicians won the Kalidas Sanman, Padma Bhushan and Padma Vibhushan awards.  Some famous performers are Gangubai Hangal, Puttaraj Gawai, Pt. Bhimsen Joshi, Pt. Mallikarjun Mansur, Basavaraj Rajguru, Sawai Gandharva and Kumar Gandharva.

Folk music
Folk music is popular in Karnataka. Many singers have recorded numerous folk songs in Kannada including B. K. Sumitra, Bangalore Latha, B. R. Chaya and many. Folk songs including Bhagyada balegara, Nimbiya Banada, Ghallu Ghallenuta, Munjaneddu Kumbaranna, Mayadantha Male Bantanna, Maralladyane and many, are popular, recreated and reused in films as well.

Dance

Yakshagana

Yakshagana a form of dance drama is one of the major theatrical forms in coastal Karnataka.  A fusion of folk and classical tradition makes Yakshagana a unique form of art which includes colourful costumes, music, dance, singing, and most importantly dialogs composed on the fly. Award-winning performers include Shambhu Hegde, Chittani Ramachandra Hegde. Yakshagana and Dollu Kunitha are two of the popular dance forms of Karnataka. Gamaka is a unique music form based on Karnataka Sangeetha.

Pilivesha 

Pilivesha a dance form popularly displayed on the streets and temples around the coastal Karnataka. The speciality of this dance form is that it requires the dancer to paint his body with the picture of a tiger

Painting 
The Bengal renaissance, along with the general influence of Ravi Varma school of painting, influenced the Mysore school of painting. King Krishnaraja Wodeyar III patronised famous painters including Sundarayya, Tanjavur Kondayya and Alasinrayya. King Krishnaraja Wodeyar IV patronised K. Venkatappa, Keshavayya, Y. Nagaraju, Y. Subramanya Raju, Paavanje, and Kamadolli.  The Chamarajendra Technological Institute (CTI—currently modified into Chamarajendra Academy of Visual Arts—CAVA), Jaganmohan Art Gallery and Venkatappa Art Gallery are reminders of this heyday. Chitrakala Parishat is an organisation in Karnataka dedicated to promote visual arts, particularly the folk and traditional art.

Utsav Rock Garden which is located in Gotagodi Village, Shiggaon Taluk, Haveri District, Karnataka. It includes innumerable sculptures depicting the rural life of Karnataka and also a wide array of creative and modern paintings.

See also 
List of people from Karnataka

References